Shaybah Airport is a small airfield located in the remote Shaybah oil complex in the Eastern Province of Saudi Arabia. The airport is adjacent to the employees accommodation compound.

Overview
The airport was built and is operated by the Saudi Arabian Oil Company Saudi Aramco, providing vital logistic support to this remote isolated area in the desert. Using Boeing 737s, the company operates regular flights to Dammam and al-Hasa, the capital and the largest city of the province.

Facilities
The airport has one paved runway in addition to an old unpaved runway that is no longer used. The paved runway is 2,440 meters long and 27 meters wide. A space allocated to four airplanes to park at the airport.

Parking
Parking lot is located just outside the terminal across the street.

Airports in Saudi Arabia